Razia Quashie (born 16 September 1997) is a netball player who plays for England and the Hertfordshire Mavericks.
She had her senior debut with the England national netball team in October 2018 in the Sunshine Series against Jamaica.

Quashie came through the Mavericks pathway system, and will remain with the team for the 2019 Netball Superleague season.

References 

Living people
1997 births
Place of birth missing (living people)
English netball players
Netball Superleague players
Mavericks netball players